Vermilion Cliffs National Monument is located in northern Coconino County, Arizona, United States, immediately south of the Utah state line. This national monument,  in area, protects the Paria Plateau, Vermilion Cliffs, Coyote Buttes, and Paria Canyon. Elevations in the monument range from 3,100 feet to 6,500 feet above sea level (944 to 1,981 meters).

Creation and designation
Established on November 9, 2000 by a presidential proclamation by President Bill Clinton, Vermilion Cliffs National Monument was carved from existing lands already under the management of the U.S. Government in extreme northern Coconino County, Arizona, immediately south of the border with the state of Utah. The monument is administered by the U.S. Bureau of Land Management, an agency within the U.S. Department of the Interior. The Vermilion Cliffs themselves run along the southern and eastern edges of the monument. Much of the monument's land consists of the Paria Plateau, a flat area extending northward from the tops of the cliffs.

Vermilion Cliffs

These sedimentary rocks have been deeply eroded for millions of years, exposing hundreds of layers of richly colored rock strata. Mesas, buttes, and large tablelands are interspersed with steep canyons, where some small streams provide enough moisture to support a sampling of  wildlife.

Flora and fauna
More than twenty species of raptors, including bald eagles and golden eagles, peregrine falcons, and several hawk species, have been observed. The endangered California condor has been re-introduced into this region recently due to its remote location and lack of human habitation. Desert bighorn sheep, pronghorns, and mountain lions make up most of the large mammals found here, with about 30 more species of smaller mammals. Several examples of rare fish species, such as the flannelmouth sucker and the speckled dace live in the streams of the monument. The Welsh's milkweed Asclepias welshii, a threatened plant species that grows on sand dunes and helps stabilize them, is known to exist only in the monument and one other area in neighboring Utah.

Human settlements

Human settlement in the region dates back 12,000 years, and hundreds of Native American pueblos are spread across the monument. The remains of the natives' villages, with houses, granaries, burial areas, and associated ruins, can be found here. The monument also contains one of the largest number of rock art sites in any nationally protected area. Many of these petroglyphs are believed to be among the oldest in the United States.

The first explorers into the region were Spanish missionaries and explorers from the 1776 Domínguez–Escalante expedition. Later, Mormon explorers searched the region during the 1860s, some of them settling on land that is now within the monument. They built one of the first ferry crossings on the Colorado River in 1871. That same year, John Wesley Powell ventured through this region during his scientific explorations of the Colorado River plateau.

Below the Vermilion cliffs runs the historic "Honeymoon Trail", a wagon route for Mormons who journeyed to have their marriages sealed in the temple at St. George, Utah, and then to return. The route, through remote country, was otherwise seldom used. Historical markers denote this history.

Today, the region surrounding the monument is relatively unspoiled with virtually no permanent inhabitants remaining and limited road access.

See also

 List of national monuments of the United States

References

External links

 
 Proclamation establishing Vermilion Cliffs National Monument
 USGS Navajo Bridge (AZ) Topo Map
 National Geographic: Vermilion Cliffs National Monument

National Monuments in Arizona
Protected areas of Coconino County, Arizona
Bureau of Land Management National Monuments
Bureau of Land Management areas in Arizona
Colorado Plateau
Sandstone in the United States
Jurassic Arizona
2000 establishments in Arizona
Protected areas established in 2000
Units of the National Landscape Conservation System
Geotopes